Walter Charles Barnes (born January 19, 1944) is a former American football defensive lineman in the National Football League for the Washington Redskins and the Denver Broncos.  He played college football at the University of Nebraska and was drafted in the second round of the 1966 NFL Draft.  Barnes was also selected in the third round of the 1966 AFL Draft by the Kansas City Chiefs.  He played professionally in the American Football League for the Denver Broncos in 1969.He attended University of Nebraska-Lincoln.

See also

List of American Football League players

References

1944 births
Living people
All-American college football players
American football defensive linemen
Denver Broncos (AFL) players
Denver Broncos players
Nebraska Cornhuskers football players
Players of American football from Chicago
Washington Redskins players